The 1921 Liga Peruana de Football was the tenth and last season to be organized by the Peruvian Football League. It encompassed a first division and a second division. A total of 11 teams competed in the first division and its champion was Sport Progreso. Records of the second division are unavailable.

First Division

External links
Peruvian Championship 
Peruvian Football League News 
La Liga Peruana de Football 

Peru
Peruvian Primera División seasons
1921 in Peruvian football